Weather girl may refer to:

 Weather girl, an informal name for a woman presenting weather information, usually via TV or radio, from actual meteorologists
 Weather Report Girl, a 1994 Japanese erotic anime
 Weather Girl or Weather Woman (Otenki-oneesan), a 1996 live action film based on the anime, starring Kei Mizutani
 Weather Girl, a 2009 American comedy film
 Weather Girls, a Japanese idol group from Taiwan, or their 2013 debut album
 The Weather Girls, an American female musical duo
 The Weather Girl, City Hall Square, Copenhagen, Denmark
 The weather girl, a feature of the defunct Sydney Sun tabloid, see Page 3#Other newspapers

See also
 Weatherman (disambiguation)
 Weather (disambiguation)